Kitunda is a town and an administrative ward in the Ilala District of the Dar es Salaam Region of Tanzania.  The Soni Falls lie to the northeast of the town. The town gets its name from the Swahili word for the pawn in chess.

In 2016 the Tanzania National Bureau of Statistics report there were 40,307 people in the ward, from 57,132 in 2012.

References

Ilala District
Wards of Dar es Salaam Region
Constituencies of Tanzania